Kashyap Pramod "Kash" Patel (born February 25, 1980) is an American attorney,  children's book author and former government official. He served as chief of staff to the Acting United States Secretary of Defense under President Donald Trump. Patel has worked at the United States National Security Council and United States House of Representatives and was previously a federal public defender, a federal prosecutor working on national security cases, and a legal liaison to the United States Armed Forces. He is a Republican. 

Patel has widely been described by news organizations as a "Trump loyalist". As an aide to Congressman Devin Nunes, Patel played a key role in helping Republican attempts to fight the investigations into Donald Trump and Russian interference in the 2016 election.

Early life and education
Kashyap "Kash" Patel was born in Garden City, New York, to Gujarati Indian parents who had immigrated to the United States from East Africa, via Canada, in 1980. He graduated from Garden City High School.

Patel graduated from the University of Richmond in 2002. He received a certificate in international law from University College London in 2004, and earned a Juris Doctor from Pace University School of Law in 2005.

Career

Early career
After graduating from law school in 2005, Patel worked as a public defender in Florida for eight years, first in the Miami-Dade County public defender's office and later as a federal public defender. As a public defender he represented clients charged with felonies including international drug trafficking, murder, firearms violations, and bulk cash smuggling.

In 2014, Patel was hired as a trial attorney in the United States Department of Justice National Security Division, where he simultaneously served as a legal liaison to the Joint Special Operations Command. During this period he was embedded with a special mission unit at a "secure facility" and, in 2015, received a commendation from the Central Intelligence Agency. In 2017, Patel was appointed senior counsel on counterterrorism at the House Select Committee on Intelligence.

Aide to Devin Nunes 
In April 2017, Patel become the senior committee aide to House Intelligence Committee chair Devin Nunes. He played a prominent role in the Republican opposition to the investigations into Donald Trump and Russian interference in the 2016 election.

According to The New York Times, Patel was the primary author of the 2018 Nunes memo, alleging FBI misconduct in its application for a warrant from the Foreign Intelligence Surveillance Court for electronic surveillance of former Trump campaign aide Carter Page.

That claim was disputed by the committee's staff director, by a spokesman for Devin Nunes, and by unattributed sources interviewed by India Abroad. Patel did not offer a public comment on the matter. The New York Times opined that the memo was widely dismissed as "biased" containing "cherry-picked facts", but "it galvanized President Trump's allies and made Mr. Patel a hero among them".

After Democrats took control of the House of Representatives in January 2019, Patel worked for about a month as a senior counsel at the House Reform and Oversight Committee.

Executive branch

Positions 
Patel was hired in February as a staffer for President Trump's National Security Council (NSC), working in the International Organizations and Alliances directorate, and in July 2019 became Senior Director of the Counterterrorism Directorate, a new position created for him. According to The Wall Street Journal, Patel led a secret mission to Damascus in early 2020 to negotiate the release of Majd Kamalmaz and journalist Austin Tice, both of whom were being held by the Syrian government. 

In February 2020, Patel moved to the Office of the Director of National Intelligence (ODNI), becoming a Principal Deputy to Acting Director Richard Grenell. Later that month, Patel was part of Trump's entourage during the state visit of the United States to the Republic of India and was noted in press reports as one of two Americans of Indian descent to accompany the president.

Patel has widely been described as a "Trump loyalist".

Trump-Ukraine scandal

Within months of Patel's appointment to the NSC, it was suspected that Patel had assumed the role of an additional independent back channel for the President, which was seen as potentially detrimental to American policy in Ukraine. It was noticed that during NSC meetings Patel took few notes and was underqualified for his portfolio, the United Nations. 

Red flags were raised when President Trump referred to Patel as "one of his top Ukraine policy specialists" and as such wished "to discuss related documents with him". Patel's actual assignment was counter-terrorism issues, rather than Ukraine. He was thought to have operated independently of Giuliani's irregular, informal channel. Impeachment inquiry witnesses have been asked what they know about Patel. Fiona Hill told investigators that it seems "Patel was improperly becoming involved in Ukraine policy and was sending information to Mr. Trump." Sondland and Kent testified they did not come across Patel in the course of their work.

On December 3, 2019, the House Intelligence Committee's report included phone records, acquired via subpoenas to AT&T and/or Verizon Wireless, including a 25-minute phone call between Patel and Giuliani on May 10, 2019. The call occurred after Giuliani and Patel attempted to call each other for several hours, and less than an hour after a call between Giuliani and Kurt Volker. Five minutes after the 25-minute call between Giuliani and Patel, an unidentified "-1" phone number called Giuliani for over 17 minutes, after which Giuliani called his associate Lev Parnas for approximately 12 minutes.

In a statement to CBS News on December 4, 2019, Patel denied being part of Giuliani's Ukraine back-channel, saying he was "never a back channel to President Trump on Ukraine matters, at all, ever", and that his call with Giuliani was "personal".

In an October 2019 story, Politico, citing an anonymous source it reported had formerly worked at the White House, wrote that Patel had "unique access" to Donald Trump, and had provided "out of scope" advice to him on the United States' Ukraine policy. Patel denied the claims and, the following month, sued Politico for defamation, seeking $25 million in damages.

Reported move to lead CIA
In January 2021, Axios reported that Trump had considered Patel for appointment as Acting Director of the Central Intelligence Agency to replace Gina Haspel. According to Axios, Patel was to be appointed Deputy Director of the Central Intelligence Agency immediately before a planned dismissal of Haspel, allowing him to head the agency in an acting capacity. In an interview with Vanity Fair, Ezra Cohen-Watnick confirmed parts of the Axios report. Patel declined to comment.

U.S. Department of Defense

In November 2020, Patel was made chief of staff to Acting Secretary of Defense Christopher C. Miller, a move that followed Trump's firing of Secretary of Defense Mark Esper. Patel reportedly argued that Esper was disloyal to Trump by refusing to deploy military troops to Washington to quell the George Floyd protests.

AEI policy director Kori Schake argued that although neither Patel nor others were "confirmable", the shakeup was primarily a matter of "spite" toward the Pentagon establishment. Foreign Policy magazine connected the move to Trump's "refusal to accept the election results". Based on interviews with defense experts, Alex Ward of Vox suggested that Patel's appointment was "not sinister", would "not change much", and may have served an effort to accelerate the withdrawal of troops from Afghanistan. According to an unnamed source quoted by Vanity Fair, Miller was a "front man" during his time as Acting Secretary of Defense while Patel and Cohen-Watnick were "calling the shots" at the Department of Defense. Another source told the magazine that Patel was the most influential person in the U.S. government on matters of national security.

After the contentious November 2020 election, Patel reportedly blocked some Department of Defense officials from helping the Biden administration transition, according to NBC. As chief of staff, Patel was designated to lead the Department of Defense's coordination with the presidential transition of Joe Biden, and also supported a departmental initiative to separate the National Security Agency from the U.S. Cyber Command.

Involvement in Trump documents investigation
The National Archives and Records Administration (NARA) found in 2021 that Trump had taken some presidential documents with him to his home in Florida after leaving office. After Trump returned some documents, NARA found others were still missing, including some that were highly classified. NARA referred the matter to the FBI, and after requests and a subpoena to return the documents went unheeded, the FBI entered Trump's home under a search warrant to retrieve them. Patel publicly asserted that Trump had declassified broad sets of sensitive documents before leaving the White House. In October 2022, Patel was summoned to testify before a federal grand jury investigating the matter, but he declined to answer questions by invoking his Fifth Amendment right against self-incrimination. The Justice Department sought but failed to persuade a federal judge to compel Patel's testimony, whereupon he was granted immunity to testify, which he did on November 4, 2022.

Post-government career
In April 2022, Patel became a member of the board of directors for the Trump Media & Technology Group, owner of the Truth Social media platform.

Patel is the author of a children's picture book, titled The Plot Against the King, which articulates the fact that the Steele dossier was used as evidence to initiate investigations in Russian interference in the 2016 United States elections. Illustrated by Laura Vincent, the book was published in May 2022 by Brave Books. It is a fanciful retelling with characters that are caricatures of real people, written for early grade school-age children.

On June 19, 2022, Trump sent a letter to the National Archives naming Patel and John Solomon as "representatives for access to Presidential records of my administration".

Personal life
Patel resides in the District of Columbia. He plays ice hockey. In 2014, he agreed to participate in a bachelor auction of what Above the Law described as "very handsome lawyers" to benefit Switchboard of Miami, but he withdrew from the auction after a blogger noted his Florida law license was out of date.

Notes

References

Living people
Pace University School of Law alumni
People from Garden City, New York
Public defenders
Trump administration personnel
United States Department of Defense officials
United States National Security Council staffers
University of Richmond alumni
Washington, D.C., Republicans
1980 births
American people of Gujarati descent
American politicians of Indian descent
Garden City High School (New York) alumni
Asian conservatism in the United States